The Extraordinary and Plenipotentiary Ambassador of Peru in the People's Republic of China is the official representative of the Republic of Peru to the Government of the People's Republic of China.

The ambassador to China was also accredited to Japan until 1971, when Peru recognized the PRC, and the Democratic People's Republic of Korea from the establishment of relations in 1988 until 2017, when Peru declared the Korean ambassador as a persona non grata and gave him 5 days to leave the country in response to the country's missile launches earlier that month.

Peru established relations with the Chinese Empire with the signing of a treaty in Tianjin on June 26, 1874. Peru's first Resident Ambassador was named the next year, assuming his duties on May 20, 1878, while the Chinese ambassador would only reach Peru in 1883, after the War of the Pacific.

After the establishment of the Republic of China, Peru maintained its relations with the new Kuomintang government. In 1944, the diplomatic status of the two countries was raised to embassy level, and high-level officials of the two countries exchanged frequent visits in the 1950s and 1960s.

After the establishment of Juan Velasco Alvarado's Revolutionary Government, Peru established relations with the People's Republic of China on November 2, 1971, with the Republic of China severing its relations and closing its embassy in Lima as a result, and the PRC opening its embassy the following year. As such, Peru became the third Latin American country to recognize the Beijing-based government, and has since adhered to the One China policy.

List of representatives

Chinese Empire (1875–1919)

Republic of China (1919–1971)

People's Republic of China (1971–present)

See also
List of ambassadors of China to Peru
List of ambassadors of Peru to Japan
List of ambassadors of Peru to South Korea

References

Ambassadors of Peru to China
China
Peru